The Antricoccus suffuscus is a species of bacteria.

References 

Actinomycetia